Air Commandant Dame Veronica Margaret Ashworth,  (25 December 1910 – 12 January 1977) was a British nurse, midwife, and Royal Air Force officer. From 1963 to 1966, she served as Matron-in-Chief of Princess Mary's Royal Air Force Nursing Service.

Early life and education
Ashworth was born on 25 December 1910. She was educated at St Katharine's School, an all-girls private school in Wantage, Oxfordshire. She trained as a nurse at St Bartholomew's Hospital, London from 1930, becoming a state registered nurse (SRN) in 1934, and then moved to Leeds Maternity Hospital, becoming a state certified midwife (SCM) in 1935.

Military career
Ashworth joined the Princess Mary's Royal Air Force Nursing Service (PMRAFNS) in 1936, and after training was appointed to the permanent service on 1 April 1937. During the Second World War, she served in Algiers, Tunisia and Italy, with a mobile field hospital.

Ashworth served as matron of the hospitals at RAF Wroughton and RAF Uxbridge in England, and at RAF Fayid in Egypt. She was awarded a permanent commission in the Royal Air Force on 1 February 1949 with the rank of flight officer. She was promoted to wing officer on 1 January 1958, and to group officer on 1 January 1961. On 4 August 1963, she was appointed Matron-in-Chief of the Princess Mary's Royal Air Force Nursing Service and made an acting air commandant. She was promoted to air commandant on 1 September 1963. She stepped down as Matron-in-Chief in 1966, and retired from the Royal Air Force.

In the 1959 Queen's Birthday Honours, Ashworth was appointed a Member of the Royal Red Cross, First Class (RRC). She was made an Honorary Nursing Sister to the Queen (QHNS) on 1 September 1963. In the 1964 New Year Honours, she was appointed a Dame Commander of the Order of the British Empire (DBE).

References

External links
 

1910 births
1977 deaths
Princess Mary's Royal Air Force Nursing Service officers
Members of the Royal Red Cross
British women nurses
British midwives
People educated at the School of St Helen and St Katharine